Shyam Lal Meena (born 4 March 1965 in Banswara, Rajasthan, India) is an archer from India. He represented India at 1988 Summer Olympics. The Government of India honoured him with an Arjuna award in 1989.
First international gold medal for rajasthan

References

External links
 

Indian male archers
Archers at the 1988 Summer Olympics
Olympic archers of India
Rajasthani people
Recipients of the Arjuna Award
Archers from Rajasthan
People from Banswara district
1965 births
Living people